Sareshkeh (also Romanized as Sereshkeh; also known as Sereshke) is a village in Baz Kia Gurab Rural District, in the Central District of Lahijan County, Gilan Province, Iran. At the 2006 census, its population was 841, in 284 families.

People and culture
The people of Sareshkeh are Gilak and Gileki with Bie-pish dialect is spoken in Sareshkeh. All of the people in Sareshkeh are Shi'a muslims. The people of Sareshkeh for many centuries endorsed the advancement of literacy and science.
Sareshkeh's rice is sold all over the country.
The other products of Sareshkeh are tea, garlic, cucumber and pumpkin.

Climate and weather
Sareshkeh enjoys a climate known as 'moderate Caspian'. This weather pattern emerged from the influence of the currents of both the Alborz Mountains and the Caspian Sea. The Talesh Mountains are stretched in a north to south direction, and the Alborz Mountains in an east to west direction. These serve as a barrier against the humid north-west Caspian winds and withhold the penetration of wind bearing vapors towards Iran's mainland, causing heavy rainfall in Gilan during the Spring and Fall seasons.

Sareshkeh with a weather more favorable than the other points in the Gilan has warmer winters and cooler summers. Freezing temperatures are seldom reported in the coastal areas, however it is not odd for Sareshkeh to experience periods of near blizzard conditions during the winter. The amount of rainfall in Sareshkeh depends on the winds bearing vapor that blow from the North West in winter, from the East in spring and from the West in summer and autumn. These winds carry the vapor and humidity towards the plains causing heavy and prolonged rainfalls.

Sports
The popular sport of Sareshkeh is football. Sareshkeh football team is one of the most powerful teams in Gilan. Wrestling and Table football are the other sports in Sareshkeh.

Politics
The Sareshkeh council is the largest decision authority in Sareshkeh.

References 

Populated places in Lahijan County

glk:سرشكه